In computer programming, a p-code machine (portable code machine) is a virtual machine designed to execute p-code (the assembly language or machine code of a hypothetical central processing unit (CPU)). This term is applied both generically to all such machines (such as the Java virtual machine (JVM) and MATLAB precompiled code), and to specific implementations, the most famous being the p-Machine of the Pascal-P system, particularly the UCSD Pascal implementation, among whose developers, the p in p-code was construed to mean pseudo more often than portable, thus pseudo-code meaning instructions for a pseudo-machine.

Although the concept was first implemented circa 1966—as O-code for the Basic Combined Programming Language (BCPL) and P code for the language Euler—the term p-code first appeared in the early 1970s. Two early compilers generating p-code were the Pascal-P compiler in 1973, by Kesav V. Nori, Urs Ammann, Kathleen Jensen, Hans-Heinrich Nägeli, and Christian Jacobi, and the Pascal-S compiler in 1975, by Niklaus Wirth.

Programs that have been translated to p-code can either be interpreted by a software program that emulates the behavior of the hypothetical CPU, or translated into the machine code of the CPU on which the program is to run and then executed.  If there is sufficient commercial interest, a hardware implementation of the CPU specification may be built (e.g., the Pascal MicroEngine or a version of a Java processor).

Benefits and weaknesses of implementing p-code

Compared to direct translation into native machine code, a two-stage approach involving translation into p-code and execution by interpreting or just-in-time compilation (JIT) offers several advantages.

 It is much easier to write a small p-code interpreter for a new machine than it is to modify a compiler to generate native code for the same machine.
 Generating machine code is one of the more complicated parts of writing a compiler. By comparison, generating p-code is much easier because no machine-dependent behavior must be considered in generating the bytecode. This makes it useful for getting a compiler up and running quickly.
 Since p-code is based on an ideal virtual machine, a p-code program is often much smaller than the same program translated to machine code.
 When the p-code is interpreted, the interpreter can apply additional run-time checks that are difficult to implement with native code.

One of the significant disadvantages of p-code is execution speed, which can sometimes be remedied via JIT compiling. P-code is often also easier to reverse-engineer than native code.

In the early 1980s, at least two operating systems achieved machine independence through extensive use of p-code. The Business Operating System (BOS) was a cross-platform operating system designed to run p-code programs exclusively. The UCSD p-System, developed at The University of California, San Diego, was a self-compiling and self-hosting operating system based on p-code optimized for generation by the Pascal language.

In the 1990s, translation into p-code became a popular strategy for implementations of languages such as Python, Microsoft P-Code in Visual Basic, and Java bytecode in Java.

The language Go uses a generic, portable assembly as a form of p-code, implemented by Ken Thompson as an extension of the work on Plan 9 from Bell Labs. Unlike Common Language Runtime (CLR) bytecode or JVM bytecode, there is no stable specification, and the Go build tools do not emit a bytecode format to be used at a later time.  The Go assembler uses the generic assembly language as an intermediate representation, and Go executables are machine-specific statically linked binaries.

UCSD p-Machine

Architecture
Like many other p-code machines, the UCSD p-Machine is a stack machine, which means that most instructions take their operands from a stack, and place results back on the stack. Thus, the add instruction replaces the two topmost elements of the stack with their sum. A few instructions take an immediate argument. Like Pascal, the p-code is strongly typed, supporting boolean (b), character (c), integer (i), real (r), set (s), and pointer (a) data types natively.

Some simple instructions:

 Insn.   Stack   Stack   Description
         before  after
  
 adi     i1 i2   i1+i2   add two integers
 adr     r1 r2   r1+r2   add two reals
 inn     i1 s1   b1     set membership; b1 = whether i1 is a member of s1
 ldi     i1 i1   i1      load integer constant
 mov     a1 a2   a2      move
 not     b1 b1   -b1     boolean negation

Environment
Unlike other stack-based environments (such as Forth and the Java virtual machine) but very similar to a real target CPU, the p-System has only one stack shared by procedure stack frames (providing return address, etc.) and the arguments to local instructions. Three of the machine's registers point into the stack (which grows upwards):

 SP points to the top of the stack (the stack pointer).
 MP marks the beginning of the active stack frame (the mark pointer).
 EP points to the highest stack location used in the current procedure (the extreme pointer).

Also present is a constant area, and, below that, the heap growing down towards the stack. The NP (the new pointer) register points to the top (lowest used address) of the heap. When EP gets greater than NP, the machine's memory is exhausted.

The fifth register, PC, points at the current instruction in the code area.

Calling conventions
Stack frames look like this:

 EP ->
       local stack
 SP -> ...
       locals
       ...
       parameters
       ...
       return address (previous PC)
       previous EP
       dynamic link (previous MP)
       static link (MP of surrounding procedure)
 MP -> function return value

The procedure calling sequence works as follows: The call is introduced with

  mst n

where n specifies the difference in nesting levels (remember that Pascal supports nested procedures). This instruction will mark the stack, i.e. reserve the first five cells of the above stack frame, and initialise previous EP, dynamic, and static link. The caller then computes and pushes any parameters for the procedure, and then issues

  cup n, p

to call a user procedure (n being the number of parameters, p the procedure's address). This will save the PC in the return address cell, and set the procedure's address as the new PC.

User procedures begin with the two instructions

  ent 1, i
  ent 2, j

The first sets SP to MP + i, the second sets EP to SP + j. So i essentially specifies the space reserved for locals (plus the number of parameters plus 5), and j gives the number of entries needed locally for the stack. Memory exhaustion is checked at this point.

Returning to the caller is accomplished via

  retC

with C giving the return type (i, r, c, b, a as above, and p for no return value). The return value has to be stored in the appropriate cell previously. On all types except p, returning will leave this value on the stack.

Instead of calling a user procedure (cup), standard procedure q can be called with

  csp q

These standard procedures are Pascal procedures like readln() (csp rln), sin() (csp sin), etc. Peculiarly eof() is a p-Code instruction instead.

Example machine
Niklaus Wirth specified a simple p-code machine in the 1976 book Algorithms + Data Structures = Programs. The machine had 3 registers - a program counter p, a base register b, and a top-of-stack register t. There were 8 instructions:
 lit 0, a  :  load constant a
 opr 0, a  :  execute operation a (13 operations: RETURN, 5 math functions, and 7 comparison functions)
 lod l, a  :  load variable l,a
 sto l, a  :  store variable l,a
 cal l, a  :  call procedure a at level l
 int 0, a  :  increment t-register by a
 jmp 0, a  :  jump to a
 jpc 0, a  :  jump conditional to a

This is the code for the machine, written in Pascal:

const
	amax=2047;      {maximum address}
	levmax=3;       {maximum depth of block nesting}
	cxmax=200;      {size of code array}

type 
	fct=(lit,opr,lod,sto,cal,int,jmp,jpc);
	instruction=packed record 
		f:fct;
		l:0..levmax;
		a:0..amax;
	end;

var
	code: array [0..cxmax] of instruction;

procedure interpret;

  const stacksize = 500;

  var
    p, b, t: integer; {program-, base-, topstack-registers}
    i: instruction; {instruction register}
    s: array [1..stacksize] of integer; {datastore}

  function base(l: integer): integer;
    var b1: integer;
  begin
    b1 := b; {find base l levels down}
    while l > 0 do begin
      b1 := s[b1];
      l := l - 1
    end;
    base := b1
  end {base};

begin
  writeln(' start pl/0');
  t := 0; b := 1; p := 0;
  s[1] := 0; s[2] := 0; s[3] := 0;
  repeat
    i := code[p]; p := p + 1;
    with i do
      case f of
        lit: begin t := t + 1; s[t] := a end;
        opr: 
          case a of {operator}
            0: 
              begin {return}
                t := b - 1; p := s[t + 3]; b := s[t + 2];
              end;
            1: s[t] := -s[t];
            2: begin t := t - 1; s[t] := s[t] + s[t + 1] end;
            3: begin t := t - 1; s[t] := s[t] - s[t + 1] end;
            4: begin t := t - 1; s[t] := s[t] * s[t + 1] end;
            5: begin t := t - 1; s[t] := s[t] div s[t + 1] end;
            6: s[t] := ord(odd(s[t]));
            8: begin t := t - 1; s[t] := ord(s[t] = s[t + 1]) end;
            9: begin t := t - 1; s[t] := ord(s[t] <> s[t + 1]) end;
            10: begin t := t - 1; s[t] := ord(s[t] < s[t + 1]) end;
            11: begin t := t - 1; s[t] := ord(s[t] >= s[t + 1]) end;
            12: begin t := t - 1; s[t] := ord(s[t] > s[t + 1]) end;
            13: begin t := t - 1; s[t] := ord(s[t] <= s[t + 1]) end;
          end;
        lod: begin t := t + 1; s[t] := s[base(l) + a] end;
        sto: begin s[base(l)+a] := s[t]; writeln(s[t]); t := t - 1 end;
        cal: 
          begin {generate new block mark}
            s[t + 1] := base(l); s[t + 2] := b; s[t + 3] := p;
            b := t + 1; p := a
          end;
        int: t := t + a;
        jmp: p := a;
        jpc: begin if s[t] = 0 then p := a; t := t - 1 end
      end {with, case}
  until p = 0;
  writeln(' end pl/0');
end {interpret};

This machine was used to run Wirth's PL/0, a Pascal subset compiler used to teach compiler development.

Microsoft P-Code
P-Code is a name for several of Microsoft's proprietary intermediate languages. They provided an alternate binary format to machine code. At various times, Microsoft have said p-code is an abbreviation for either packed code or pseudo code.

Microsoft p-code was used in Visual C++ and Visual Basic. Like other p-code implementations, Microsoft p-code enabled a more compact executable at the expense of slower execution.

Other implementations

See also

 Bytecode
 Intermediate representation
 Joel McCormack, designer of the NCR Corporation version of the p-code machine
 Runtime system
 Token threading
 City & Guilds Mnemonic Code

References

Further reading
 
  (NB. Has Pascal sources of the P4 compiler and interpreter, usage instructions.)
  (NB. Has the p-code of the P4 compiler, generated by itself.)
 
 , including packaging and pre-compiled binaries; a friendly fork of the 
 
 
 
 
  (NB. Especially see the articles Pascal-P Implementation Notes and Pascal-S: A Subset and its Implementation.)

External links

Stack-based virtual machines
Pascal (programming language)

Programming language implementation
Articles with example Pascal code